The Flight of Dragons is a 1979 speculative evolution book written by Peter Dickinson and illustrated by Wayne Anderson.

Thesis
According to Dickinson's hypothesis, the chief obstacle to admitting the past existence of dragons is the difficulty of powered flight by such a large organism. To resolve this, he introduces a dirigible-like structure in which hydrochloric acid would dissolve large amounts of rapidly growing bone, releasing massive amounts of hydrogen that, once aloft, would support the body above the ground. The dragon's wings are traced to "modifications of the ribcage" (an anatomical evolutionary path shared by the genus Draco), and the expulsion of fire from the throat, as a means of removal of excess gas. The absence of fossil evidence is traced again to the internal acids, which (in Dickinson's view) would dissolve the bones soon after death.

Dickinson states he got the idea for his "pseudo-scientific monograph" after looking at one of Ursula K. LeGuin's Earthsea books: 
This one had a bulky body and rather stubby wings, which obviously would never get it airborne, let alone with the two people it was carrying on its back, and all its own weight of muscle and bone. Obviously any lift had to come from the body itself. Its very shape suggested some kind of gas-bag. I thought about it for the rest of the journey, and on and off for a couple of days after, and at the end of that time had managed to slot everything I knew about dragons – why they laired in caves, around which nothing would grow and where hoards of gold could be found, why they had a preferred diet of princesses, how and why they breathed fire, why they had only one vulnerable spot and their blood melted the blade of the sword that killed them, and so on – into a coherent theory that explained why these things were necessary accompaniments to the evolution of lighter-than-air flight.

Film

In 1982, Rankin/Bass Productions released a made-for-TV animated film The Flight of Dragons, aspects of which were based on Dickinson's book. For example, the character design in the film bears a resemblance to the illustrations in the book, and its lead character takes his name from the author, Peter Dickinson. However, the animated film derives most elements of its story line from the novel The Dragon and the George.

See also
The Last Dragon (2004 film), a docufiction film which uses similar speculative evolutionary ideas.

References

1979 books
Dragons in popular culture
Speculative evolution
Books about dragons